Transport within Leeds consists of extensive road, bus and rail networks. The city has good rail and road links to the rest of the country. Leeds railway station is one of the busiest in Britain, and Leeds is connected to the national road network via the A1(M) motorway, M1 motorway and M62 motorway. The city is served by Leeds Bradford Airport.

Leeds has less extensive public transport coverage than other UK cities of comparable size, and is the largest city in Europe without any form of light rail or underground.

Rail

The rail network is of great importance. Leeds railway station on New Station Street is one of the busiest in the UK outside central London, with around 1,000 trains serving more than 100,000 passengers who pass through the main ticket gates daily. Its modern interior provides connections to Birmingham, Bristol, Exeter, Newcastle via CrossCountry. Edinburgh and the north can be accessed via CrossCountry or London North Eastern Railway services to Aberdeen, although changes are often required at York or Newcastle. Manchester, Liverpool and the west are accessible by TransPennine Express, as are Scarborough and Hull in the east. There is a large commuter rail network co-ordinated by Metro and operated by Northern to many villages, towns and cities in the city region.

The station has 17 platforms, making it the largest in England outside London, and the second largest, after Edinburgh Waverley, in the UK, having been rebuilt from 12 platforms in 2001 at a cost of £265 million.

From Leeds, West Yorkshire Metro trains operated by Northern operate to all parts of West Yorkshire and surrounding local and commuter locations and other operators including CrossCountry, London North Eastern Railway and TransPennine Express operate services to the rest of the country.

Leeds is connected to London via the electrified East Coast Main Line which operates half-hourly through the day. This service terminates at London Kings Cross.

Railway stations in Leeds

Leeds
Bramley
Burley Park 
Cross Gates
Cottingley
East Garforth
Garforth
Guiseley
Headingley
Horsforth
Kirkstall Forge 
Micklefield
Morley
New Pudsey
Woodlesford

Closed railway stations

Marsh Lane
Leeds Wellington
Leeds New
Leeds Whitehall
Leeds Central
Newlay
Kirkstall
Hunslet Station
Hunslet Lane
Holbeck
Armley Moor
Armley Canal Road
Beeston
Pendas Way
Scholes
Kippax
Otley
Pool-in-Wharfedale
Arthington
Stanningley
Pudsey Lowtown
Pudsey Greenside
Calverley

High Speed rail and Leeds New Lane

Publication of the proposed route of the second phase of High Speed 2 on 28 January 2013 revealed that the station at Leeds would be a new terminus called Leeds New Lane, connected to Leeds station by pedestrian walkways, possibly with moving walkways. However, following a review in November 2015, there have also been proposals to instead add the HS2 platforms as an extension to the existing Leeds station. On 18 November 2021 the UK government confirmed that the Leeds leg of HS2 would be scrapped, favouring instead investment in a mass transit system.

Middleton Steam Railway

The Middleton Steam Railway is the oldest continuously working railway system in the world.  Originally built to transport coal from Middleton Colliery to Leeds, the railway is now a heritage piece.  The railway effectively runs the length of Middleton Park, joining onto the national rail network at the northern end.  The Middleton Steam Railway contains Leeds' only road level crossings (Moor Road and Tulip Street, Hunslet).  There are two stations, Park Halt and Moor Road. The steam locomotives for the Middleton railway were made in Holbeck, near to the location of the present Leeds railway station.

Abbey Light Railway

The Abbey Light Railway was a narrow gauge railway in Kirkstall, Leeds. It ran between Bridge Street and Kirkstall Abbey, but was dismantled in March 2013, after the owner, Peter Lowe, died in October 2012.

Roads
Leeds is the focus of the regional primary road network which includes A58, A61, A62, A63, A64 and A65 roads. It is also a principal hub of the national motorway network, with the M1 and M62 intersecting in the south east of the city and the A1(M) running along its eastern border. The M1 joins the A1(M) in east Leeds, creating a semi-orbital motorway consisting of the M62, M1 and A1(M) motorways around the south and east of the city. The M621 carries high volumes of traffic quickly in and out of central Leeds from the M62 and M1.

The Inner Ring Road largely carries through traffic across the city, whereas the City Centre Loop distributes local traffic around the city centre. The City Centre Loop that was formed by using a number of streets to create a one way loop, however they will soon not be a continues loop around the city centre for cars as more roads get pedestrianized. This acts as a local access thoroughfare for city centre traffic, allowing the core centre to be heavily pedestrianised and largely traffic-free.

Leeds was going to introduce a Clean Air Zone in 2020, which will charge the most polluting buses, coaches HGVs £50 a day to enter the city, while taxis and private hire vehicles which are not clean enough will be charged £12.50 a day. The proposals came after the government ordered the council to come up with ways to lower the air pollution in the city, which causes around 29,000 premature deaths in the UK. However has been cancelled, some ANPR enforcement cameras are still active but not used by the council.

Inner Ring Road

In the 1960s Leeds set about building the most ambitious ring road plan of any British city. The road is designated as a motorway, and describes a semicircle round the western, northern and eastern parts of the city centre. The road is elevated at its western and eastern ends but in cutting and tunnel to the north. This enabled a long stretch to be hidden underground, reducing the scar it makes in the city's fabric (as has been a problem in many other cities, for example Birmingham and Leicester). Pedestrians may walk over it into the city centre, completely unaware of its presence.  This gave Leeds City Council the idea to promote the city with the slogan Motorway City of the Seventies.

The inner ring road is made up of the A58(M) from the Armley Gyratory continues as the A64(M) to Quarry Hill/Marsh Lane. (the number A58 forks off to the north at Clay Pit Lane and The A64 continues east as graded dual carriageway with a mix of grade separated and traffic light controlled junctions.) The Inner Ring Road junctions off and heads southwards under the Railway and join the A61 East Street/South Accommodation Road towards the East Bank. (Here, it meets the East Leeds Link Road (A63), which provides fast connections to the M1 junction 45 at Skelton Lake.) The IRR continues over the River Aire using the John Smeaton Viaduct as a high quality dual carriageway on a flyover, meeting the M621 at Junction 4 Hunslet. The M621 completes the southern flank of the Inner Ring Road, linking up to the A643 Ingram Distributor at M621 at Junction 2 Elland Road which joins back to the Armley Gyratory.

City centre loop

To manage traffic in the city centre and to provide an efficient traffic distributor around the city, inside the Inner Ring Road the city centre loop was created. This involved no actual engineering or construction work, but the remaking of the city's entire one way system. One of the main advantages of the loop is its simplicity: whereas in other cities unfamiliar drivers may have to plan a route across the city's one way system or have to attempt map reading while driving, perhaps missing lanes and turnings, in Leeds the main body of city centre traffic is carried around the loop in a clockwise direction, and drivers can simply follow the signs and use the convenient junction numbers. However the city centre loop is less useful for drivers wishing to travel in an anti-clockwise direction, this was satirized by Michael McIntyre All loop signage is marked with the city centre loop logo, and each junction has a number and a name. The city centre loop connects the A58, A61, A64, A660, A65, A653 and A62 as well as smaller local routes. The route runs by Leeds railway station, the Merrion Centre, Quarry House, and Leeds General Infirmary as well as through the heart of the city's financial district.

The Loop will soon be removed as City Square is closed to general traffic and transformed into a 0.69 ha public realm. Loop branded signs will be taken down local access will be retained but they will be no thoroughfare for general traffic. Any traffic from Swingate will have to turn left onto Neville Street. With The main access from the IRR

Motorways and A roads
Leeds is served by the M1 and A1 heading South towards London and the East Midlands, the A1(M) heading north towards Newcastle upon Tyne and Edinburgh, the M62 heading both west towards Bradford, Manchester, Liverpool and the M62 and east towards Kingston upon Hull and the Port of Hull (this is a particularly important freight route).

Away from motorways, a regional dual carriageway network meets in Leeds. The A64 is an important trunk road, heading as an unbroken dual carriageway to the outskirts of York and then on to Scarborough. Added to this, the A61 expressway to the north links the northern suburbs of Leeds to the city centre, and onto Harrogate and Ripon. The A660 and A65 dual carriageways link the commuter belts to the north west of the city and onto the Lancashire, meeting the A650. The A6110 expressway forms part of the Leeds Outer Ring Road and continues as dual carriageway southwards, connecting the areas south of the M62 to Leeds. The Outer Ring Road is designated as A6120 in the north of the city. To the north east of the city, the East Leeds Orbital Route being constructed by Balfour Beatty will take the Outer Ring Road away from existing residential areas and facilitate development of land as part of an East Leeds Extension project. Guided bus routes using kerb guidance operate on parts of the A61 (Scott Hall Road) and A64 (York Road).

The M621 is an internal urban motorway. Much of it is the former M1 (until it was diverted as the South East Leeds Orbital linking the M1 and A1(M)). The motorway begins at the M62 in Birstall, (near Ikea), and finishes where it merges with the M1 at Stourton. Since the M1 diversion the motorway has increased in length, previously it only ran from Birstall as far as the city centre. The M62 and M1 collectively create a part-orbital motorway around the south and east of the city.

Bus/coach/taxi

On 30 January 2006, the zero-fare FreeCityBus started running, on a circular route (including stops at the bus and railway stations), in the centre of Leeds.

This route has now been changed to First Leeds City Electric route 5 and costs £1 or free with a First or WY metro Day rider or a City Park&Ride ticket.

Leeds City bus station, on Dyer Street is served by long distance Megabus and National Express services and local bus services. Buses in the city are mainly provided by Arriva Yorkshire, First West Yorkshire and Transdev Blazefield. with some smaller operators including CT+ and Station Coaches.

Harrogate Bus Company provides The 36 to Harrogate and Ripon, and 7 to Harrogate via Wetherby.

Keighley Bus Company provides a service to Shipley, Bingley and Keighley.

The Yorkshire Coastliner service runs from Leeds bus station - Tadcaster - York - Malton. The 840 Splits to serve Pickering - Thornton-le-Dale, to Whitby. 843 runs to Scarborough. service 845 to Bridlington via Filey was withdrawn.

Stagecoach in Hull operated the X62 to Hull via Goole, while Stagecoach Yorkshire operated the X10 to Barnsley. These have since been withdrawn.

The 26 stand bus station Is the only bus station in the City centre. some have described it as a controversy in the city. One of the main reasons is its distance from the railway station (about half a mile). Many buses do not use the station.

Leeds has a "public transport box" around a pedestrian core, they are clusters of bus stops on Eastgate, The Headrow, Park Row, Infirmary Street Boar Lane, Vicar Lane, Leeds Corn Exchange Albion Street, Cookridge Street, and outside the main entrance to the railway station for services linking the railway station with the rest of the city's public transport.

In an attempt to simplify the bus network WYCA has intrude a core bus network map and branding: They are some inconsistently but the aim is to only have high frequent (15 minutes or better) buses, each corridor having a colour and using the same colours on the bus stops to aid way finding. Feedback from the new map said people would find it useful for more services to be included e.g. 91 'urban loop' and Square peg route 9, First 9 and 9a Ring road bus to show connectivity, but WYCA wanted to forces only on high frequent city centre routes.

They are 3 flag ship City Park & Ride sites and proposals for more!

PR1 - Elland Road

PR2 - Temple Green

PR3 - Stourton

The railway station has a dedicated public hire taxi rank that operates 24 hours a day. The rank is serviced by the whole Leeds fleet of 537 taxis, 237 of which are wheelchair accessible. All are fitted with a taxi meter set to Leeds City Council's fare tariff. All drivers are knowledge tested and have undergone criminal records investigations. All vehicles, drivers, and operators of both taxis and private hire vehicles must be licensed by the council. This will soon be removed much like the taxi rank at the Airport and outside Millgarth police Station, leaving only on street bays.

Cycling
There is no integrated cycle network, No public bicycle-sharing system. In 2010 Leeds Cyclepoint opened at Leeds railway station providing cycle hire by the day as well as paid secure parking for up to 300 cycles. The council provide maps showing ideal road routes for cyclists cycling maps. The Leeds Cycling Campaign works with the council and campaigns for improved cycling provision.

In late 2014 work started on Cycle City Connect, which includes a mostly segregated cycle path connecting Seacroft in East Leeds to Bradford, as well as resurfacing parts of the Leeds-Liverpool Canal shared use tow path. The project has been controversial due to the poorly laid surface by the contractor, Kier, as well as safety concerns surrounding the junctions where motorized traffic comes into contact with the segregated facility. It was originally meant to open as one route but instead of one route in Leeds city centre a mini network will be delivered by further schemes, resources were redeployed to help with the recovery after the Boxing day floods. So it was Split in two CS1 Leeds west to Bradford and CS2 Leeds east to Seacroft. Latter and after Learning lessons CS 3 Has been delivered with 2 one way tracks along Clay Pit Lane to Sheepscar (much like CS1 and CS2) and a wide two way cycle track along Elland Road with Copenhagen crossings over side streets.

The Government is granting more money to Leeds, one example is £7.06m under Transforming Cities Fund (TCF) to deliver missing links in the City centre with 5 gateways

This type of work shows the DFT and HM Treasury that Leeds is a city that can deliver on a budget (unlike others) which puts Leeds City Council in a favorable light when it comes to future funding bids (for example mass-transit)

Since the 2014 Tour de France the number of publicly available bike lock-up rack has been increased, which includes high capacity racks in the shapes of cars. This is continued by the Tour de Yorkshire

Trams and trolleybus

Former system

Leeds' tram system was dismantled in the early 1950s (as was the case in most cities) with the final services running in November 1959. In recent years this decision has become regarded as short-sighted. The former tram routes are evident on some of the main roads in and out of the city; for instance the void in the A64 York Road, now filled with guided bus lanes, and the unusually wide central reservation between the carriageways on the A58 Easterly Road (towards Wetherby). The original tram system ran a larger route than the proposed supertram; the original system ran along the A64, A58, A61, A660 and also down through Beeston and Belle Isle. By the time the tram network was dismantled it had become unpopular with many people in Leeds, due to its ageing, draughty and poorly maintained fleet. Neighbouring Bradford lost its trolley bus system during the same era (the final journey being made in 1972). Sheffield also lost its tram system several years earlier, yet has seen the return of the tram in the early 1990s.

Rejected plans

The city had plans in the 1990s and 2000s for a tram network known as Supertram. However the government axed the scheme due to an unwillingness to pay for any costs over budget, despite an undertaking by the City Council and local businesses to underwrite any such additional costs and the Department for Transport's apparent preference of a bus-based rapid transport scheme to a tram-based scheme. An inquiry into corruption at the Department of Transport was called for, although nothing came from the calls.

Trolley bus

From 2009, proposals were developed to build a trolley bus system, also referred to as "New Generation Transport". The three proposed lines would have run into Leeds city centre from Park and ride sites at Stourton (South Route) and Bodington, just beyond the Ring Road on the A660 (North Route), and from St James's Hospital (East Route). In the city centre there would have been a loop route connecting the three incoming routes. A revised version of the proposal was considered at a planning inquiry in 2014, the outcome of which was a recommendation that the scheme not be proceeded with.

Air

Leeds Bradford Airport is located to the north-west of the city and has scheduled flights to destinations within Europe plus Egypt and Turkey. The airport is the largest in Yorkshire. Since the arrival of budget airline Jet2 (who chose Leeds Bradford as their base) the airport has experienced a considerable increase in passenger numbers. Jet 2 have operated seasonal (Christmas period ) services to and from New York City but there are no regular scheduled services between Leeds Bradford and the United States.

In 2007 the five metropolitan councils of West Yorkshire sold the airport to Bridgepoint Capital for in excess of £140 million. The new owners are currently drawing up an expansion plan. There is no railway station close to the airport, but there is a proposed parkway station located North of Horsforth and south of the Bramhope tunnel. With Access from Scotland Lane due to open by 2024

They are 3 direct bus services:

A1: Leeds - Kirkstall - Horsforth - Leeds Bradford Airport (half-hourly service)

A2: Bradford - Leeds Bradford Airport - Harrogate (hourly service)

A3: Bradford - Shipley - Guiseley - Yeadon - Leeds Bradford Airport - Otley (hourly service)

There is a direct rail service from Leeds station to Manchester Airport, the nearest airport with regular intercontinental flights, with trains running throughout the night. Doncaster Sheffield Airport is 40 miles from Leeds. Craven College operates an Aviation Academy based at the airport.

Sea and waterways
The Leeds and Liverpool Canal links the city to Liverpool and the west coast. The Aire and Calder Navigation links Leeds to the Humber and the east coast. The city has a dock, situated on both canals at Clarence Dock (adjacent to the Royal Armouries). Leeds has good connections by road, rail and coach to Hull, only an hour away, from where it is possible to travel to Rotterdam and Zeebrugge by ferry services run by P&O Ferries.

In 2014, a free river taxi service was introduced between Leeds Dock and Granary Wharf; operated by boats "Twee" and "Drei".

Transport information services for Leeds
Leeds City Council provides Leeds Travel Info, an online service of real-time travel information, including information about roadworks, traffic incidents, and car park availability for motorists as well as access to local public transport information. West Yorkshire Metro provides bus and train information online and offers the "My Next Bus" service of real-time bus information by text message or online. This real-time information is also displayed in certain bus shelters.

Leeds is one of the cities covered by the urban pedestrian route-planning system Walkit.com.

Works and programmes concerned with transportation improvements for the city are reported on the Connecting Leeds website.

References